The Galactic Center Saga is a series of books by author Gregory Benford detailing a galactic war between mechanical and biological life.

 In the Ocean of Night (1977) — 1977 Nebula Award nominee, 1978 Locus Award nominee
 Across the Sea of Suns (1984)
 Great Sky River (1987) — 1988 Nebula Nominee
 Tides of Light (1989) — 1990 Locus Award nominee
 Furious Gulf (1994)
 Sailing Bright Eternity (1996)
 "A Hunger for the Infinite" a novella published in the anthology Far Horizons

Reception
Paul Witcover in Sci Fi Weekly wrote that the series is "one of the most ambitious and enthralling sagas in all of science fiction: The epic tale of a star-spanning civilization of intelligent machines methodically working to exterminate a species of pestiferous vermin that calls itself humanity."

Adaptation
In 2001, film director Jan De Bont announced that a television series based on the six-book saga was "in the works" at Viacom Productions. However, no such series has been produced.

References

External links
 

Science fiction book series